The 2006 All-Ireland Under-21 Hurling Championship final was a hurling match played at Croke Park, Kilkenny on 10 October 2006 to determine the winners of the 2006 All-Ireland Under-21 Hurling Championship, the 43rd season of the All-Ireland Under-21 Hurling Championship, a tournament organised by the Gaelic Athletic Association for the champion teams of the four provinces of Ireland. The final was contested by Kilkenny of Leinster and Tipperary of Munster, with the game ending in a 2-14 apiece draw. The replay took place on 16 September 2006, with Kilkenny winning by 1-11 to 0-11.

Details

Drawn game

Replay

References

2006 in hurling
All-Ireland Under-21 Hurling Championship Finals
Kilkenny GAA matches
Tipperary GAA matches